Othoniel Arce Jaramillo (born 8 November 1989) is a Mexican professional footballer who plays as a forward.

Club career

San Luis F.C. 
He made his senior team debut on August 7, 2010, as a starter in a match against C.D. Guadalajara in a 1 - 0 loss of San Luis F.C.
He scored his first goal against C.F. Pachuca in September 2010.

Honours
Municipal
Liga Nacional: Apertura 2019

Mexico U23
Pan American Games: 2011

Individual
Mexican Primera División Best Rookie of the tournament: Apertura 2010

References

External links
 
 
 msn.mediotiempo.com
 
 

1989 births
Living people
Footballers from the State of Mexico
Association football forwards
Footballers at the 2011 Pan American Games
Pan American Games gold medalists for Mexico
Pan American Games medalists in football
San Luis F.C. players
C.F. Monterrey players
Club León footballers
C.F. Pachuca players
Querétaro F.C. footballers
Lobos BUAP footballers
Atlético San Luis footballers
Cimarrones de Sonora players
Club Necaxa footballers
C.D. Suchitepéquez players
FBC Melgar footballers
Mexican expatriate footballers
Mexican expatriate sportspeople in Guatemala
Expatriate footballers in Guatemala
Mexican expatriate sportspeople in Peru
Expatriate footballers in Peru
Medalists at the 2011 Pan American Games
Mexican footballers